Shark Tale is a 2004 American computer-animated comedy film produced by DreamWorks Animation and distributed by DreamWorks Pictures. The film was directed by Vicky Jenson, Bibo Bergeron, and Rob Letterman (in Letterman’s feature directorial debut), from a screenplay written by Letterman and Michael J. Wilson. The film features an ensemble cast that includes the voices of Will Smith, Robert De Niro, Renée Zellweger, Jack Black, Angelina Jolie, Martin Scorsese, Ziggy Marley, Doug E. Doug, Michael Imperioli, Vincent Pastore, Peter Falk, and Katie Couric. It tells the story of Oscar, an underachieving fish who falsely claims to have killed the son of a shark mob boss, to advance his community standing. Oscar teams up with the mobster's younger son to keep up the facade.

Shark Tale premiered at the Venice Film Festival on September 10, 2004, and was theatrically released in the United States on October 1. It made $374.6 million worldwide against its $75 million budget, finishing its theatrical run as the ninth-highest-grossing film of 2004. The film received mixed reviews from film critics. Advocacy groups criticized the film for its use of Italian-American stereotypes. It was nominated for Best Animated Feature at the 77th Academy Awards, but lost to Pixar's The Incredibles.

Plot
In the Southside Reef, a lowly Bluestreak cleaner wrasse named Oscar fantasizes about being rich and famous, but owes money to his boss, a pufferfish named Sykes. His best friend, an angelfish named Angie, offers him a pearl that was a gift from her grandmother to pawn and pay his debt. Meanwhile, Don Lino, the boss of a mob gang of sharks, orcas, swordfish, and octopuses, dislikes that his son Lenny is a vegetarian, and orders his eldest son, Frankie, to mentor Lenny.

Oscar brings the money from the pearl to a seahorse race to meet Sykes, but hears that the race is rigged and bets it all on a seahorse named "Lucky Day". A lion fish gold digger named Lola sees this and flagrantly seduces Oscar. Sykes is annoyed that Oscar bet the money, but he hopes that Oscar might win. Lucky Day eventually takes the lead, only to trip and lose short of the finish line. Sykes loses his temper and orders his two Jamaican jellyfish enforcers, Ernie and Bernie, to deal with Oscar. While the two shock a tied-up Oscar, Frankie sees them and urges Lenny to eat Oscar, but Lenny instead frees Oscar and tells him to escape. Furious and fed up with his brother's tenderness, Frankie charges at Oscar, but is suddenly crushed to death by an anchor from the surface. Devastated and blaming himself for his brother's demise, Lenny leaves. With no other witnesses, Oscar takes credit for killing Frankie and quickly rises in fame as the "Sharkslayer".

Sykes becomes Oscar's manager and forgives his debt, and Oscar moves to the "top of the reef" to live in luxury. At the same time, Lino has everyone search for Lenny and the "Sharkslayer". Oscar encounters Lenny who, aware of Oscar's lie, begs Oscar to let him stay at his place to avoid returning to his father. Angie soon finds out about Oscar's lie and threatens to tell everyone, but he and Lenny convince her to be quiet. The next day, Oscar and Lenny stage a battle involving Oscar "fighting" off Lenny, thus cementing Oscar's popularity and making the sharks believe that Lenny has been killed too, infuriating Lino. Lola kisses Oscar on camera, making Angie jealous. That night, as Lenny disguises himself for his new life as a dolphin, Oscar and Angie get into a heated argument, where she reveals that she had feelings for Oscar even before he became the "Sharkslayer". Oscar reflects on his selfishness and dumps Lola, who beats him up in anger.

Oscar buys some gifts for Angie, only to discover that Lino has kidnapped her to stage a meeting, which Lola is also attending in revenge for being dumped. Lino threatens to eat Angie if Oscar does not surrender, but Lenny "eats" Angie to save her. He soon regurgitates her, and Lino realizes the "dolphin" is Lenny. Enraged, Lino chases Oscar through the reef. Oscar flees to the Whale Wash, accidentally trapping Lenny in the machinery before also trapping Lino. Everyone cheers for Oscar, but he finally confesses the truth behind Frankie's death while urging Lino to respect Lenny's lifestyle. Lino reconciles with Lenny and accepts him, and states that he and his gang bear the city no ill will. Oscar forsakes all the wealth he has acquired, becomes co-owner of the Whale Wash (which is now frequented by the gang members), and begins a romantic relationship with Angie.

Voice cast

 Will Smith as Oscar, a comical, streetwise Bluestreak cleaner wrasse who works in the Whale Wash of Reef City and often concocts schemes to become rich.
 Robert De Niro as Don Lino, a great white shark and leader of a mob consisting of criminally-inclined sharks, who wants his two sons to take over his business and run it together.
 Renée Zellweger as Angie, a pink angelfish who harbors a secret crush on Oscar.
 Jack Black as Lenny, Don Lino's youngest son, a vegetarian, and the younger brother of Frankie, who becomes good friends with Oscar and Angie.
 Angelina Jolie as Lola, a seductive female lion fish whom Oscar develops a romantic interest in.
 Martin Scorsese as Sykes, a loan shark pufferfish who owns the Whale Wash and to whom Oscar owes five thousand clams.
 Ziggy Marley and Doug E. Doug as Ernie and Bernie, two jellyfish with Jamaican accents and Sykes' enforcers, who enjoy torturing Oscar with their painful stingers when he is in trouble with their boss.
 Michael Imperioli as Frankie, Lenny's older brother and Don Lino's more vicious son, who is embarrassed by Lenny's vegetarian views. 
 Vincent Pastore as Luca, Don Lino's teal octopus "left-hand, right-hand man", with a tendency to state the obvious, much to Lino's frustration.
 Peter Falk as Don Feinberg, an elderly leopard shark and leader of a mob of criminally-inclined leopard sharks, who is a friend of Don Lino.
 Katie Couric as Katie Current, a female sea bass who is the local reporter of the Southside Reef in the U.S. release. At the time, Katie Couric co-hosted Today in America. In the Australian release, then local Today co-host Tracy Grimshaw dubbed the lines. Fiona Phillips of the UK's GMTV performed the voice for the British release of the film. Cristina Parodi of Italy's Verissimo provided the Italian version of the character.
 David P. Smith as Crazy Joe, a deranged hermit crab who is Oscar's best friend.
 Bobb'e J. Thompson, Kamali Minter, Emily Lyon Segan as the Shorties, three delinquent young fish and friends of Oscar who love to spray graffiti. Two of them are cowfishes and one is a Pennant coralfish.
 Shelley Morrison as Mrs. Sanchez, an old grumpy weeverfish.
 David Soren as an unnamed shrimp who fears being eaten by a shark and is an enemy to Don Lino.
 Sean Bishop as an unnamed green sperm whale who attends the Whale Wash.
 Christina Aguilera and Missy Elliott portray fish versions of themselves at the end of the film, singing "Car Wash".

Production
The film was officially announced and began production in April 2002, under the title of Sharkslayer, with Vicky Jenson (Shrek) and Eric "Bibo" Bergeron (The Road to El Dorado) serving as the two directors before Rob Letterman, who also co-wrote the screenplay, joined in as the third and final director. By September 2003, it had been retitled Shark Tale, to make the title sound less violent and more family friendly. Bill Damaschke, the producer of the film, explained the change of the title: "We set out to make a movie a little more noir, perhaps a little darker than where we've landed." Shark Tale is the first all computer-animated film produced at DreamWorks Animation's Glendale facility, which previously animated the studio's four hand-drawn animated movies, The Prince of Egypt, The Road to El Dorado, Spirit: Stallion of the Cimarron, and Sinbad: Legend of the Seven Seas, as well as the first computer-animated film to not be produced by Pacific Data Images.

James Gandolfini was initially set to voice the kingpin shark, named Don Lino, but he had to drop out, with Robert De Niro taking over the role.

The film was produced concurrently with Finding Nemo, another animated film set underwater, which was released a year and a half before Shark Tale. DreamWorks Animation's CEO, Jeffrey Katzenberg, defended the film, saying that "any similarities are mere coincidence. We've been open with the Pixar people, so we don't step on each other's toes."

Marketing
The film had promotional support from Burger King, Kellogg’s, General Mills, Coca-Cola and Hewlett-Packard.

Release

Shark Tale was originally scheduled for general release on November 5, 2004, but it was moved up to October 1 to avoid competition with Pixar's The Incredibles releasing on the same weekend. The film had its worldwide premiere on September 10, 2004, in Piazza San Marco in Venice, Italy. Screening as part of the Venice Film Festival, it marked the first time that Piazza San Marco was closed for a premiere of a major feature film. It required  of air to inflate and more than 50 tons of water for stabilization. The premiere was attended by 6,000 visitors, including Will Smith, Angelina Jolie, Robert De Niro, and Michael Imperioli. Jeffrey Katzenberg, the executive producer of the film, explained that they "wanted to find a unique way to introduce this movie to the world. We needed a big idea. … More than anything, we are in showbusiness. This is the show part."

Home media
Shark Tale was released on DVD on February 8, 2005. Physical copies contain behind-the-scenes featurettes, games and activities, blooper reels, an audition for the whale Gigi, the Car Wash music video featuring Aguilera and Elliott, and a short film Club Oscar. The film was released on Game Boy Advance Video in November 17, and on Blu-ray on February 5, 2019.

Reception

Box office
Shark Tale grossed $160.9 million in the United States and Canada and $213.7 million in other territories, for a worldwide total of $374.6 million. It was the ninth-highest-grossing film of 2004.

Shark Tale opened at #1 with $47.6 million, which was, at the time, the second-highest opening for a DreamWorks Animation film behind Shrek 2 ($108 million). It remained the #1 film in the U.S. and Canada for its second and third weekends.

Critical reception

On Rotten Tomatoes,  the film has an approval rating of 35% based on 182 reviews, with an average rating of 5.20/10. The site's critical consensus reads, "Derivative and full of pop culture in-jokes." On Metacritic, the film has a weighted average score of 48 out of 100 based on 36 critics, indicating "mixed or average reviews". Audiences polled by CinemaScore gave the film an average grade of "A−" on an A+ to F scale.

Roger Ebert gave the film two out of four stars, observing, "Since the target audience for Shark Tale is presumably kids and younger teenagers, how many of them have seen the R-rated Godfather and will get all the inside jokes? Not a few, I suppose, and some of its characters and dialogue have passed into common knowledge. But it's strange that a kid-oriented film would be based on parody of a 1972 gangster movie for adults." He also opined that younger viewers would have trouble enjoying a film about adult characters with adult problems, such as an elaborate love triangle and a main character wanting to clear his debt with loan sharks, and compared it to more successful fish-focused animated features like Pixar Animation Studios' Finding Nemo, which Ebert felt featured a simpler plot that audiences could more easily identify with. Richard Roeper commented that although the film was not on the same level as Finding Nemo, it was a film worth seeing.

Todd McCarthy of Variety was critical of the film's lack of originality: "Overfamiliarity extends to the story, jokes and music, most of which reference popular entertainment of about 30 years ago" noting that the script combines The Godfather and Jaws, with a dash of Car Wash. McCarthy calls Smith's character "tiresomely familiar", and Zellweger's "entirely uninteresting", but praises the vocal performance of Martin Scorsese. Kirk Honeycutt of The Hollywood Reporter said the film was not as good as Shrek, but called it "an overly jokey but often quite entertaining spoof that should please families everywhere."

Social commentary

Shark Tale was criticized for perpetuating negative stereotypes of Italian-Americans in its antagonists. Politician Bill Pascrell said: "The prevailing message is negative and they have to be held out to dry for it. I'm a very proud Italian-American. When you stereotype me, it's like making fun of my grandparents". Columbus Citizens Foundation issued a statement condemning the stereotyping of people with Italian names as gangsters. Dona De Sanctis, deputy executive director of the Order Sons of Italy in America, said: "We were very concerned about this type of stereotyping being passed on to another generation of children." John Mancini, the founder of the Italic Institute of America, protested the movie, stating: "We're concerned about what preteens are learning from the outside world. They don't associate other groups as criminals, they only know Italians as gangsters. Our goal here is to de-Italianize it." The protest was coordinated by the Italian American One Voice Coalition of New Jersey. DreamWorks reacted by changing the name of Peter Falk's character from Don Brizzi to Don Feinberg. However, Mancini demanded that everything Italian—character names, the mannerisms, the forms of speech—be dropped.

Accolades

Soundtrack

Shark Tale: Motion Picture Soundtrack was released on September 21, 2004. The soundtrack features newly recorded music by various artists, including Christina Aguilera, Mary J. Blige, India.Arie, Bobby Valentino, Sean Paul, Timbaland, The Pussycat Dolls, Ludacris, Missy Elliott, and Justin Timberlake, as well as "Some of My Best Friends Are Sharks", the film's closing theme composed by Hans Zimmer.

Janet Jackson and Beyoncé initially planned to record a duet for the film's soundtrack. Jackson's frequent collaborator Jimmy Jam, who had recently worked with Beyoncé for The Fighting Temptations soundtrack, commented, "Obviously we'd love to have the involvement of Janet and Beyonce, who we just worked with on Fighting Temptations. They've already expressed interest", adding "There are a lot of opportunities with an animated piece to work with some different people." Jeffrey Katzenberg, CEO of DreamWorks Animation, had appointed Jackson's producers Jam & Lewis to be involved with the soundtrack, though the duo only ended up producing only one song for the film, with Jam saying "We worked for DreamWorks before on the Bryan Adams song for Spirit: Stallion of the Cimarron and the Boyz II Men tune for The Prince of Egypt, and Katzenberg is a fan of what we do. He thought we would be perfect to do the music for Shark Tale."

Video game

A video game based on the film was released on September 29, 2004, for Microsoft Windows, Xbox, GameCube, PlayStation 2, and Game Boy Advance. Published by Activision, Edge of Reality developed the console versions of the game, while Vicarious Visions developed the Game Boy Advance version, and Amaze Entertainment developed the Microsoft Windows version. The cast from the film didn't reprise their roles in the game, except David P. Smith reprising his role as Crazy Joe.

References

External links

  (Archived from the original)
  at DreamWorks
 
 
 

2004 computer-animated films
2004 comedy films
Films about sharks
2000s American animated films
2000s buddy comedy films
2000s English-language films
American buddy comedy films
American children's animated comedy films
American computer-animated films
Animated buddy films
Animated films about fish
Cultural depictions of actors
2004 directorial debut films
2004 films
DreamWorks Animation animated films
DreamWorks Pictures films
Films about lying
Films directed by Bibo Bergeron
Films directed by Rob Letterman
Films directed by Vicky Jenson
Films produced by Bill Damaschke
Films set in the Atlantic Ocean
Films scored by Hans Zimmer
Films with screenplays by Michael J. Wilson
Films with screenplays by Rob Letterman
Sea adventure films
American crime comedy films
Underwater civilizations in fiction
Vegetarianism in fiction
Films produced by Janet Healy
Film and television memes